Bhoomi is a 2017 Indian action drama film directed and co-produced by Omung Kumar. The film stars Sanjay Dutt, Aditi Rao Hydari, and Sharad Kelkar. Principal photography commenced in February 2017 in Agra. Bhoomi trailer was launched on 10 August. The film was released worldwide on 22 September 2017.

Plot
Bhoomi Sachdeva, a designer, is all set to be married to Neeraj Mathur, her best friend, but has a problem of returning home late from work. Her father, Arun Sachdeva is an alcoholic shoe-maker who sells shoes, but the two share a loving relationship. Vishal Munshi, the son of a neighbourhood shopkeeper, is infatuated with Bhoomi and not happy about her marriage. He stalks her, and she slaps him one day when he tries to forcefully assert his love. Vishal meets his cousin Dedha's gangster boss Dhauli, who convinces him to do something about it.
 
One day before the wedding, while travelling home with her aide Jeetu, Bhoomi gets kidnapped. She finds Vishal asphyxiating her to near death, and Vishal, Dedha, and Dhauli take turns gang-raping her. Bhoomi eventually falls unconscious. On the day of the wedding, Neeraj is shocked to learn of the truth, and is forced against his will to cancel the marriage, following which, Arun and his childhood friend, Tripurari "Taj" Mishra, visit a police station to register a complaint. The police officer goes with him to his house, where they find Bhoomi missing. Bhoomi is kidnapped again by Vishal, Dhauli and Dedha. This time, once again they gang rape her before Dhauli throws her down a river.

Dhauli soon discovers that Bhoomi survived; in the ensuing court case, Arun accuses the defense lawyer of being patriarchal and body-shaming Bhoomi. The case is dismissed after they let go of Dhauli. The incident brings father and daughter closer to each other. Bhoomi is further shamed in society when people write her phone number on the walls. Neeraj returns, overcome by remorse, but cannot pacify her, as she leaves him. The next day, Jeetu's family visits and shows Bhoomi a video from Jeetu's phone detailing the rape. Realizing Jeetu was complicit in the act, Bhoomi is shocked.

Arun and Bhoomi turn ruthless and abduct Jeetu, who is then tortured. Arun goes on a scaring spree by haunting Vishal. Dhauli takes a petrified Vishal to Arun, asking Vishal to apologize, but Arun picks a fight with Dhauli. On his 18th birthday, Jeetu is killed by Arun, and his body is found in Bhagwan Talkies, where they had raped Bhoomi. The police officer who had registered Arun's complaint is surprised to see Jeetu's sister disclaiming responsibility and chiding herself for having been his sister. The officer returns Arun his keychain that he'd been holding at the police station, and says that one mustn't leave his belongings after the match is played, implying that the policeman knows Arun is the murderer. Dedha threatens Bhoomi again; Taj intervenes but crashes into an iron pole and dies from his injuries. Shattered by the loss of his friend, Arun decides to finish off Vishal, Dedha and Dhauli.

Vishal, scared off with Jeetu's murder, boards a bus but Arun and Bhoomi confront him and force him to castrate himself. Arun drives the bus to Dhauli's area. After a long scuffle, Dedha dies from his injuries. Arun and Bhoomi chase Dhauli to a temple, where Arun kills him, and he falls into a pond. He breathes his last as Bhoomi and Arun look down at the pond, having succeeded in their mission.

Cast
Sanjay Dutt as Arun Sachdeva a.k.a. Baba
Aditi Rao Hydari as Bhoomi Sachdeva, daughter of Arun Sachdeva
Riddhi Sen as Jeetu
Sharad Kelkar as Dhauli
Sidhant Gupta as Neeraj Mathur
Puru Chibber as Vishal Munshi
Sakshi Dwivedi as Diya
Shekhar Suman as Tripurari "Taj" Mishra, Arun's childhood friend
Sunny Leone in an item number "Trippy Trippy"

Reception
Sukanya Verma, writing for Rediff.com, termed it "one of the worst films of the year" and blamed it for "[taking] perverse pleasure in a woman's humiliation". She opined that Dutt's character's transformation lacked seriousness and found the film to be "ghastly". India Today critic Lakshana N Palat gave the film a 1/5 rating. Meena Iyer writing for Times of India wrote "Watch Bhoomi for Dutt. He's from that era of larger-than-life heroes who get you to applaud even when he turns into a killing machine. You may not approve of his bloodlust, but you can't fault his swagger."

Soundtrack 

The music of the film has been composed by Sachin–Jigar except where noted. In contrast, the lyrics have been penned by Priya Saraiya, Vayu, Anvita Dutt Guptan, Badshah and Utkarsh Naithani and the score is composed by Ismail Darbar. The first song of the film, "Trippy Trippy", which is sung by Neha Kakkar, Benny Dayal, Brijesh Shandilya and Badshah, was released on 18 August 2017. The second song, "Lag Ja Gale", which is sung by Rahat Fateh Ali Khan was released on 23 August 2017. The soundtrack was released by T-Series on 28 August 2017 and includes 8 songs.

References

External links

T-Series (company) films
2017 films
2010s Hindi-language films
2017 action drama films
Indian action drama films
Indian vigilante films
Indian films about revenge
Films shot in Agra
Films about rape in India
Indian rape and revenge films
Films about domestic violence
2010s vigilante films
Films shot in Mumbai